This is a list of golfers who have appeared in the top 10 of the Official World Golf Ranking (OWGR). The rankings started on 6 April 1986 and are updated each week. 114 golfers have reached the top 10.

Tiger Woods holds the record for the most weeks in the world top 10, with 906. He is followed by Ernie Els with 788 weeks and Phil Mickelson with 775 weeks. Woods had a record run of 736 consecutive weeks in the top 10 from 13 April 1997 to 15 May 2011, had another run of 124 consecutive weeks from 25 March 2012 to 3 August 2014 and 46 further weeks from 14 April 2019 to 23 February 2020. Greg Norman was in the top 10 for 646 consecutive weeks from the start of the rankings in 1986 until 16 August 1998. Sergio García is the youngest player to reach the top 10, a week after his 20th birthday.

Before the start of the OWGR in 1986, world golf rankings were published in Mark McCormack's World of Professional Golf Annual from 1968 to 1985. These end-of-year rankings had Jack Nicklaus as the number one from 1968 to 1977, Tom Watson from 1978 to 1982 and Seve Ballesteros from 1983 to 1985.

Current top 10
The table shows the top 10 ranked golfers and their average ranking points as of 19 March 2023, which is the end of week 10.

Change – change in position since the previous week.Top 10 since – indicates the date at which the player entered or last re-entered the top 10.Weeks – current number of consecutive weeks in the top 10. 

Since the major revision of the rating method in September 2001, the highest points average as well as the largest lead in points average were set by Tiger Woods on September 16, 2007. After winning the BMW Championship and The Tour Championship in consecutive weeks, he had an average of 24.36 and a lead of 14.73 points over Phil Mickelson.

Most weeks in the top 10
As of 19 March 2023, 117 players have reached the world top 10 since the rankings started in April 1986. 25 of these have reached number 1 while a further 15 have reached number 2 but never number 1.

Tiger Woods has been in the top 10 for 906 weeks. He has been number 1 for 683 weeks, number 2 for 107 weeks and number 3 for 27 weeks. Phil Mickelson was never number 1 but was number 2 for 270 weeks.

The current top-10 are in bold.

Weeks – total number of weeks in the top 10. First – date the player first reached the top 10. Last – last week the player was in the top 10. Best – highest position reached by the player. FirstB – date the player was first at this highest position.

No rankings were produced for the 12 weeks from 22 March 2020 to 7 June 2020 inclusive.

* The available data for 1986 is incomplete and this number may be incorrect. The number given is the player's highest known position.

Payne Stewart died on Monday 25 October 1999 at which time he was ranked 8th in the world. He remained on the rankings until 14 November, when he was still ranked 8, at which time he was removed from the rankings.

Youngest and oldest players
The tables below list the five youngest players to enter the top 10 and the oldest five to still be there.

The following table lists the youngest to reach a specific position in the top 10.

Tiger Woods entered the top 10 at number 3, dropped to 5th for four weeks and was then never lower than 3rd for nearly 14 years.

Most consecutive weeks in the top 10
Instances of 250 weeks or more are given. Active streaks are in bold

Longest gaps between appearances in the top 10
Instances of 200 weeks or more are given.

Number two in the rankings but never number one
15 players have reached world No. 2 in the official rankings, but have never risen to world No. 1.

First – first week the player reached number 2, Last – last week the player was at number 2, Weeks – total weeks at number 2.

Annual totals
The tables below list the number of weeks during each year that players were in the top 10, arranged by decade. In the "First" and "Last" columns, "+2000s" indicates that the player was also in the top 10 in an earlier or later decade.

1980s
29 players were in the top 10 from the start of the rankings in April 1986 to the end of 1989. Seve Ballesteros and Greg Norman were in the top 10 throughout this period.

1990s
36 players were in the top 10 during the 1990s. Greg Norman was in the top 10 for the first 450 weeks of the 1990s.

2000s
41 players were in the top 10 during the 2000s. Tiger Woods was in the top 10 throughout the 2000s.

2010s
50 players were in the top 10 in the 2010s.

2020s
28 players have been in the top 10 so far in the 2020s, updated to 19 March 2023.The current top-10 are in bold.

Year-end world top 10 players
A number of different methods have been used to calculate the rankings, so that the ranking points given below are not necessarily comparable between different years. From 1986 to 1988 total ranking points determined the order. Since 1989 average ranking points have been used. Until the end of 1995 a three-year system was used, reduced to two years from 1996. The new system produced much lower averages than the earlier one. There have been many changes even since 1996. The tapering system, whereby points gained in an event are gradually lost over the next two years, has also been changed. A change made during 2001 meant that average points were much lower than previously.

Source for 1986:

See also
List of world number one male golfers
Mark McCormack's world golf rankings

References

Notes

External links

World Number One male golfers
Golf rankings